is a 1987 Japanese film written and directed by Juzo Itami. It won numerous awards, including six major Japanese Academy awards.

The title character of the film, played by Nobuko Miyamoto, is a tax investigator for the Japanese National Tax Agency  who employs various techniques to catch tax evaders.

The director reportedly was inspired to make the film after he entered a much higher tax bracket after his success with The Funeral.

A sequel, A Taxing Woman 2, featuring some of the same characters but darker in tone, was released in 1988.

Plot
A female tax auditor, Ryōko Itakura, inspects the accounts of various Japanese companies, uncovering hidden incomes and recovering unpaid taxes.

One day Itakura persuades her boss to let her investigate the owner of a string of love hotels who seems to be avoiding tax, but after an investigation no evidence is found. During the investigation the inspector and the inspected owner, Hideki Gondō, develop an unspoken respect for each other.

Itakura is promoted to the post of government tax inspector. When the same case involving Gondō reappears Itakura is again allowed to investigate. During a sophisticated series of raids against the hotel owner's interests, she accidentally comes across a hidden room containing vital incriminating evidence. 

Six months later the two meet again. Gondō is tired after daily interrogations. Itakura tries to persuade him to surrender his last secrets for the sake of his son. Gondō asks Itakura to leave her job and come live with him, but she declines. He cuts his finger and writes the name of the secret bank account in blood on a handkerchief of hers that he saved from the first time she investigated him.

Cast
 Nobuko Miyamoto: Ryōko Itakura
 Tsutomu Yamazaki: Hideki Gondō
 Masahiko Tsugawa: Hanamura
 Yasuo Daichi: Ijūin
 Kinzoh Sakura: Kaneko
 Hajime Asō: Himeda
 Kiriko Shimizu: Kazue Kenmochi
 Kazuyo Matsui: Kumi Torikai
 Hideo Murota: Jūkichi Ishii
 Machiko Watanabe: Nurse
 Shōtarō Takeuchi: Rihei Hakamada
 Hideji Otaki: Tsuyuguchi
 Moeko Ezawa: Gondō's mistress
 Mitsuhiko Kiyohisa: Gondō's chauffeur
 Akira Shioji: Realtor
 Yoshihiro Kato: Yamada
 Mariko Okada: Mitsuko Sugiura
 Shinsuke Ashida: Ninagawa
 Kōichi Ueda: Ninagawa's confidant
 Yūsuke Nagumo: Ninagawa's henchman
 Shirō Itō: Owner of a game center
 Eitaro Ozawa: Tax accountant
 Keiju Kobayashi: Boss
 Tokuko Sugiyama: Grocery store owner's wife

Video game 
An eponymous visual novel video game was published by Capcom for the Family Computer in 1989.

Notes

References

External links
 
 
 
 
 
 

1980s sex comedy films
1987 films
Best Film Kinema Junpo Award winners
Films directed by Jūzō Itami
1980s Japanese-language films
Japanese sex comedy films
Picture of the Year Japan Academy Prize winners
1987 comedy films
1980s Japanese films